Little Flower is a neighborhood on the near eastside of Indianapolis, Indiana. Its boundaries are 16th Street, 10th Street, Emerson Avenue, and Sherman Drive.

Little Flower has two grocery stores, at least three convenience stores, restaurants, bars, a post office, churches, schools, and other entertainment options within walking distance. The neighborhood's name comes from Little Flower Catholic Church, which is located in the neighborhood. The majority of the homes in the neighborhood are bungalows, most of them constructed in the 1920s. Little Flower is part of the Near Eastside Community Organization, aimed at improving neighborhoods on the city's east side.

Location
The boundaries of the neighborhood are 16th Street on the north, 10th Street on the south, Emerson Avenue on the east, and Sherman Drive on the west.

References

External links

Map of Little Flower Neighborhood showing boundaries
Little Flower Neighborhood Association
Near Eastside Community Organization

Neighborhoods in Indianapolis